Tjuntjuntjara is a large Aboriginal community located 650 km north east of Kalgoorlie in the Goldfields–Esperance region of Western Australia, within the Shire of Menzies in the southern part of the Great Victoria Desert. 

The community relies upon regular supplies trucked from Ceduna in South Australia.

History 
The community was established in 1988 after a water bore was drilled at the location.

The Tjuntjuntjara community members are part of a larger group known as the Spinifex people, who were removed from their homelands (which range across the WA and SA border lands) prior to the British nuclear tests at Maralinga in the 1950s and 1960s.

Native title 
The community is located within the fully determined Spinifex People (WAD6043/98) native title claim area.

Governance 
The community is managed through its incorporated body, Paupiyala Tjarutja Aboriginal Corporation, incorporated under the Aboriginal Councils and Associations Act 1976 on 19 April 1989.

Town planning 
Tjuntjuntjara Layout Plan No.1 has been prepared in accordance with State Planning Policy 3.2 Aboriginal Settlements. Layout Plan No.1 was endorsed by the community on 3 December 2003 and the Western Australian Planning Commission on 4 May 2004.

References

External links
 Office of the Registrar of Indigenous Corporations
 Native Title Claimant application summary

Towns in Western Australia
Aboriginal communities in Goldfields-Esperance